High Water is a Polish historical drama TV series created by Jan Holoubek and based on Kasper Bajon's work. It was released on Netflix on 5 October 2022. The series is about the 1997 Central European flood and how it was managed by the authorities of Wrocław.

Synopsis 
The series takes place in 1997 in Wrocław, when the 1997 Central European flood is nearing the city. The main character is the hydrologist Jaśmina Tremer, who returns to Wrocław after many years to help handle the crisis. During the series, the characters have to face not only the incompetence of the local authorities, but also their own past.

Cast 
 Agnieszka Żulewska as Jaśmina Tremer
 Tomasz Schuchardt as Jakub Marczak
 Ireneusz Czop as Andrzej Rębacz
 Blanka Kot as Klara Marczak
 Anna Dymna as Lena Tremer
 Jerzy Trela as Szymon Rębacz
 Jacek Beler as Kalosz
 Klara Bielawka as Beata Kozarowicz
 Lech Dyblik as Korzun
 Roman Gancarczyk as Prof. Jan Nowak
 Łukasz Garlicki as Kulesza
 Tomasz Kot as the mayor of Wrocław
 Mirosław Kropielnicki as Col. Czacki
 Łukasz Lewandowski as Dr. Sławomir Góra
 Leszek Lichota as the deputy minister
 Maria Maj as Barbara
 Adam Nawojczyk as the voivode of Wrocław
 Marta Nieradkiewicz as Ewa Rucik
 Katarzyna Pośpiech as Maja Kruk
 Piotr Rogucki as Lt. Marek Rozwałka
 Tomasz Sapryk as Andrzej Talarek
 Dariusz Toczek as Piepka
 Piotr Trojan as Maciej Waligóra
 Grzegorz Warchoł as Kazimierz

References 

2022 Polish television series debuts
2022 Polish television series endings
Polish drama television series
Polish-language Netflix original programming
Television series set in 1997
Television series set in the 1990s